Sonelius Larel Smith (born December 17, 1942, Hillhouse, Mississippi) is an American jazz pianist and composer.

His family moved to Memphis in 1948, where he learned to play piano. He got a degree in music education at Arkansas Agricultural, Mechanical, and Normal College in Pine Bluff, Arkansas in 1969. While a student there, he played in a small ensemble for three years and worked with John Stubblefield.

Smith moved to New York City in 1969 and began playing with Kenny Dorham, Roy Brooks, Charles Mingus, Roland Kirk, Robin Kenyatta, Rashied Ali, Warren Smith, Frank Foster, Harold Vick, Donald Byrd, Elvin Jones, Archie Shepp, Freddie Hubbard, Art Blakey, and Lionel Hampton, among others. He joined Stanley Cowell's ensemble around 1973 and also worked with Shamek Farrah and Flight to Sanity in the mid-1970s.

In 1974, he was musical director for Nancy Fales' Ark, directed by Ralph Lee at La MaMa Experimental Theatre Club in the East Village of Manhattan.

Toward the end of the 1970s, he played with J.R. Mitchell, Kalaparusha Maurice McIntyre, Warren Smith, and Wilber Morris. In the 1980s, he worked with Andrew Cyrille and David Murray. He also worked as an educator for the New Muse Community Museum (1973-1986) and The Harlem School of the Arts (1990s). He has also taught at the Third Street Music School Settlement.

References

External links 

 Smith's page on La MaMa Archives Digital Collections
 Sonelius Smith at the Third Street Music School

American jazz pianists
American male pianists
1942 births
Living people
20th-century American pianists
Jazz musicians from Mississippi
21st-century American pianists
20th-century American male musicians
21st-century American male musicians
American male jazz musicians